Below are featured the wheeled undercarriage (also called landing gear) arrangements of some modern commercial jet airliners and large military aircraft.

Types of wheeled units
This table shows the main types of individual, basic wheeled units (single-wheel unit or bogies composed of multiple wheels) used on most aircraft undercarriages.

The tables below show how various types of wheeled units are arranged to form the undercarriages of some popular aircraft from manufacturers Antonov, Airbus, and Boeing.

Antonov

Airbus

Boeing

Aircraft undercarriage